is a 1986 Japanese adult animated horror comedy romance short film directed by Tatsuya Okamoto. It was released on 28 July 1986.

Plot
A high school girl working by night as a hotline owner, Rumi "Suuko" Natsumi, receives the call for help of a young man, Ryo Sugiura, who claims to transform into a destructive monster every time he masturbates. Amused and attracted by Ryo, a shy yet good-looking pulp horror aficionado, Rumi seduces him during their date on a diner, which proves him right when he transforms right there. Rumi runs away with him and, upon observing that he turns into a monster whenever sexually aroused, yet is capable to contain it by force of will, decides to try to cure him by habituating him to sexuality. They continue their date into the city's red light district following this plan.

Unbeknownst to them, they are being followed by yakuza woman Maki Nohara, who witnessed Ryo's transformation (and is also a pulp horror fan herself). Maki's twisted sukeban sister Oyuki, who happens to be a classmate of Rumi, gets interested in Ryo by a picture, so she tries to blackmail Rumi into bringing Ryo to her. When Rumi refuses and ignores her in favor of another romantic date with Ryo, Oyuki orders her yakuza gang to kidnap them. Taking the captured couple to an abandoned building, Oyuki leaves Rumi to be ravished by her men while she has her way with Ryo. Meanwhile, mistrustful of Ryo's nature and her sister's intentions, Maki sets out for the place after being warned by her henchman Hayata.

Rumi puts up a fight, but the insecure Ryo is easily raped by Oyuki, which transforms him into a monster greater than ever without possibility to control himself. Arriving there, Maki shoots him with a bazooka, but the monster regenerates and chases them to the building's roof. Before the creature advances to kill them, a tearful Rumi throws him a keepsake of their date while rebuking him, which makes Ryo snap and control his monstrous body. It is then revealed that Ryo was possessed by an alien entity that collects absorbed lifeforms, which was the cause of his transformations all along. When the entity tries to harm Rumi, Ryo finally gathers the strength to expel it from his body and send it to the night sky above.

Some time after, Maki encounters Rumi and the cured Ryo going out, and it is shown that Oyuki is now reluctantly working in Rumi's company. However, at that moment Maki hears turmoil in their nearby building, which is caused by Oyuki transforming into a monster herself.

Characters

Reception
On Anime News Network, Justin Sevakis said that "Call Me Tonight is truly original, and a total product of both manga culture and the 80s."

References

External links

1980s animated short films
1980s comedy horror films
1986 anime OVAs
1986 anime films
Animated comedy films
Anime International Company
Anime short films
Bandai Visual
Direct-to-video animated films
Horror anime and manga
Japanese animated horror films
Japanese comedy horror films
Japanese direct-to-video films
1980s Japanese-language films
Romantic comedy anime and manga